CAD is a commonly used acronym for computer-aided design.

CAD or Cad may also refer to:

Biology and medicine
 CAD (gene), an enzyme-encoding gene
 Caspase-activated DNase, a protein encoded by the DFFB gene in humans
 Coronary artery disease, a group of cardiovascular diseases
 Cold agglutinin disease, an autoimmune disease that makes the suffering predisposed to autoimmune hemolytic anemia
 Computer-aided diagnosis, software for assisting physicians in the interpretation of medical images

Chemistry 
 Charged aerosol detector, used to measure the amount of chemicals in a sample
 Collisionally activated dissociation, a technique in mass spectrometry

Economics 
 Canadian dollar, by currency code CAD
 Capital Adequacy Directives CAD1 and CAD2, EU directives on capital requirements

Science and technology 
 Cold-air damming, a meteorological phenomenon
 Computer-aided dispatch, software used to dispatch and track vehicles or personnel

Transportation 
 CAD (TransMilenio), a mass-transit station in Bogotá, Colombia
 Center axle disconnect, a type of automotive drivetrain
 Civil Aviation Department (Hong Kong), also called CAD
 CAD, the IATA code for Wexford County Airport in Michigan, United States
 CAD, the station code for Cadoxton railway station in Wales

Other uses 
 Cad (character), a man who is aware of gentlemanly codes, but does not live up to them
 Cad Coles (1886–1942), American baseball player
 Cad (river), a river in Romania
 Cad Bane, a character in the Star Wars franchise
 Central Ammunition Depot (disambiguation), several depots nicknamed "CAD"
 Chicago Assyrian Dictionary, a project to compile a dictionary of the Akkadian language
 Cylindrical algebraic decomposition, a notion and an algorithm in computer algebra and real algebraic geometry
 cad, the ISO 639 code for the  Caddo language of the Caddo Nation of Oklahoma
 CAD, abbreviation for the American Ctrl+Alt+Del (webcomic)
 Civil Affairs Division, of the US Army
 cad., caddesi in Turkish

See also 
 CADS (disambiguation)
 CADD (disambiguation)
 CAAD, abbreviation for Computer-aided architectural design